Ytterbium hydride is the hydride of ytterbium with the chemical formula YbH2. In this compound, the ytterbium atom has an oxidation state of +2 and the hydrogen atoms have an oxidation state of -1. Its resistivity at room temperature is 107 Ω·cm. Ytterbium hydride has a high thermostability.

Production
Ytterbium hydride can be produced by reacting ytterbium with hydrogen gas:
 Yb + H2 → YbH2

References

Ytterbium compounds
Metal hydrides